Candy stick may refer to:

Stick candy, a long, cylindrical hard candy with different colors and flavors swirled together.
A candy cigarette.
Micrurus fulvius, also known as the eastern coral snake, a venomous elapid found in the United States.